The 1950 Auckland City mayoral election was part of the New Zealand local elections held that same year. In 1950, elections were held for the Mayor of Auckland plus other local government positions including twenty-one city councillors. The polling was conducted using the standard first-past-the-post electoral method.

Background
Citizens & Ratepayers
The Citizens & Ratepayers Association decided not to re-select incumbent mayor John Allum to contest the mayoralty for another term. At a meeting on 30 August the association instead 'after careful consideration' selected the deputy mayor John Leonard Coakley. At the time of selection Coakley was overseas and his intention to accept nomination could not be confirmed until 8 October when he returned to Auckland after a six month excursion and stated he would accept the invitation to stand. In the meantime, undeterred at his de-selection, Allum announced he had decided to stand for re-election as an independent candidate.

Labour
The Labour Party had three people nominated for the mayoralty:

Paul Richardson, president of the Tramway Workers' Union and city council candidate at the previous three elections

At the candidate selection meeting Stewart was selected as Labour's mayoral candidate.

Mayoralty results

Councillor results

 
 
 
 
 
 
 
 
 
 
 
 
 
 
 
 
 
 
 
 
 
 
 
 
 
 

 
 
 
 
 
 
  
 
 
 
 
 
 
 
 
 
 
 
 
 
 
 
 
 
 
 
 
 
 
 
 
  

Table footnotes:
<noinclude>

References

Mayoral elections in Auckland
1950 elections in New Zealand
Politics of the Auckland Region
1950s in Auckland
November 1950 events in New Zealand